James Colebrooke Patterson, PC (1839 – February 17, 1929) was a Canadian politician.  He served as a federal cabinet minister from 1892 to 1895 and as the sixth Lieutenant Governor of Manitoba from 1895 to 1900.

Early life
Patterson was born to a Protestant family in Armagh, Ireland, and was educated at Dublin.  He moved to Canada in 1857 and entered the civil service, though he later resigned.  He subsequently trained in law and was called to the bar in 1876.

Political career
Patterson settled in the Windsor area and held a number of local offices (including a ten-year term as reeve of Windsor).  In 1875, he was elected to the Ontario legislature as a Conservative, defeating independent candidate L. Montreuil by 1209 votes to 755 in the riding of Essex North.

In 1878, Patterson resigned his provincial seat to run for the federal House of Commons.  He was elected in the riding of Essex, defeating Liberal William McGregor by 2596 votes to 2318.

Patterson became a backbench supporter of Prime Minister John A. Macdonald's government and was re-elected in the federal riding of Essex North in 1882 and 1887.  On the former occasion, he defeated J.A. Kilroy by 1714 votes to 1022.  On the latter, he defeated Liberal Francis Cleary by 2301 votes to 2165.  He also served as president of the Ontario Conservative Union during a part of his time in parliament.

Patterson was defeated in the federal election of 1891, losing to William McGregor by 2892 votes to 2043.  In spite of this, he was subsequently called into the cabinet of John Abbott, who became prime minister following Macdonald's death following the 1891 election.  He was sworn in as Secretary of State of Canada on January 25, 1892, and was re-elected to parliament on February 22 (defeating Liberal Malcolm Colin Cameron by 25 votes in a Huron West by-election).

When John S.D. Thompson replaced Abbott as prime minister in late 1892, Patterson was transferred to the Ministry of Militia and Defence.  He held this position until March 26, 1895 (aside from a nine-day gap in December 1894), having been retained in the position when Mackenzie Bowell replaced Thompson in mid-1894.  He sought to bolster Canada's defensive capabilities and oversaw the construction of fortifications in Esquimalt, British Columbia.  After stepping down from his ministry in March 1895, he served as a minister without portfolio.

Patterson resigned from cabinet entirely on September 1, 1895, to be sworn in as the new Lieutenant-Governor of Manitoba.  This was a period of upheaval in Manitoba's political culture, as the Manitoba Schools Question was in the last stages of its ongoing legal challenges.  Patterson was responsible for overseeing the end of most state funding for Catholic and francophone schools, although it is not clear that he played a significant role in the matter.  The lieutenant governor's position was largely ceremonial by this time.  Patterson does not appear to have re-entered political life when his term ended in 1900.

In addition to his political career, Patterson was also involved in journalism.  He was the founder of Canadian Magazine, a work meant to showcase Canada's literary culture.

Legacy
Patterson is commemorated by Paterson Street in Winnipeg, Manitoba.

J. C. Patterson Collegiate Institute in Windsor, Ontario was named after him.

External links
 
 Ontario Parliamentary History
 Manitoba Historical Society profile

1839 births
1929 deaths
Lieutenant Governors of Manitoba
Members of the House of Commons of Canada from Ontario
Conservative Party of Canada (1867–1942) MPs
People from Armagh (city)
Politicians from Windsor, Ontario